How to Become Clairvoyant is the fifth solo release from Canadian singer-musician Robbie Robertson. It was released on April 5, 2011, and peaked at No. 13 on the US Billboard 200 albums chart. Critical reviews were generally positive.

The album features guests Eric Clapton (on tracks 3–8 and 10), Steve Winwood, Trent Reznor (who provided textures on the track "Madame X"), Tom Morello, Robert Randolph, Rocco DeLuca, Angela McCluskey, and Taylor Goldsmith of Dawes. Bassist Pino Palladino, keyboardist Martin Pradler and drummer Ian Thomas are the rhythm section on most songs.

Robertson performed "He Don't Live Here No More" on CBS's Late Show with David Letterman  and ABC's The View in support of the album, with the band Dawes.

Track listing
All tracks composed by Robbie Robertson; except where indicated
 "Straight Down the Line" – 5:19
 "When the Night Was Young" – 5:05
 "He Don't Live Here No More" – 5:46
 "The Right Mistake" – 4:30
 "This Is Where I Get Off" – 5:09
 "Fear of Falling" (Eric Clapton, Robertson) – 5:18
 "She's Not Mine" – 4:28
 "Madame X" (Eric Clapton) – 4:46
 "Axman" – 4:36
 "Won't Be Back" (Eric Clapton, Robertson) – 4:10
 "How to Become Clairvoyant" – 6:17
 "Tango for Django" (Robertson, Marius de Vries) – 3:50

Personnel 

Robbie Robertson – guitar, electric guitar, gut-string guitar, keyboards, vocals
Angelyna Boyd – backing vocals
Ann Marie Calhoun – violin
Eric Clapton – acoustic and electric guitar, gut-string guitar, slide guitar, vocal harmony, backing vocals
Marius de Vries – keyboards, piano
Rocco DeLuca – dobro, backing vocals
Bill Dillon – guitar, guitorgan
Jimi Englund – percussion
Dana Glover – backing vocals
Taylor Goldsmith – backing vocals
Eldad Guetta – horn
Tina Guo – cello
Michelle John – backing vocals
Daryl Johnson – backing vocals
Jim Keltner – drums
Frank Marocco – accordion
Angela McCluskey – vocals
Natalie Mendoza – backing vocals
Tom Morello – guitar
Pino Palladino – bass
Martin Pradler – Wurlitzer piano
Robert Randolph – pedal steel guitar
Ian Thomas – drums
Sharon White – backing vocals
Steve Winwood – organ

References

External links

How To Become Clairvoyant at Discogs

2011 albums
429 Records albums
Albums produced by Marius de Vries
Albums produced by Robbie Robertson
Robbie Robertson albums